The Collected Works of Jeremy Bentham is a series of volumes under production at the Bentham Project which, when complete, will form a definitive edition of the writings of the philosopher and reformer Jeremy Bentham (1748–1832). It includes texts which Bentham published (or which were published in his name) during his lifetime; and also the many texts which remained unpublished at his death, and which exist only in manuscript.

Scope and history
The Collected Works is intended to supersede the 11-volume The Works of Jeremy Bentham (1838–1843), edited by Bentham's friend and literary executor, John Bowring, which is now considered to be flawed in many points of detail, and which omits Bentham's writings on religion; and also the 3-volume Jeremy Bentham's Economic Writings (1952–54) edited by Werner Stark, which has likewise been subject to criticism.

The series is being published under the auspices of the Bentham Project, based in the Faculty of Laws at University College London, whose library holds the majority of Bentham's surviving manuscripts. Since 2010 the Project has also run Transcribe Bentham, a project for transcribing Bentham's manuscripts through crowdsourcing, the output of which is intended, once edited, to appear in future Collected Works volumes.

The Bentham Project is governed by the Bentham Committee, which was established in 1959. The first volume in the Collected Works appeared in 1968, and to date 34 volumes have been published. The initial estimate was that the series would eventually run to approximately 38 volumes, but this figure has since risen to a projected total of 80. The series divides into two sequences: the Correspondence (including letters both to and from Bentham); and the Works, i.e. writings which Bentham intended for publication, although many never progressed beyond drafts or outlines.

The series was published from 1968 until 1981 by the Athlone Press (once the University of London's publishing house, now defunct). From 1983 ro 2019 it was published by Oxford University Press under its Clarendon Press imprint. The first five volumes of Correspondence, originally published by Athlone Press, were reissued with minor corrections in 2017 by UCL Press, both in hard copy and in open access electronic formats.

Since the publication in February 2022 of the 35th volume in the edition, Panopticon versus New South Wales, and Other Writings on Australia, the Collected Works has been published by UCL Press, which makes available books in hardback, paperback, and open access PDF formats.

General Editors
The General Editors of the series have been: J. H. Burns (1961–79); J. R. Dinwiddy (1977–83); Fred Rosen (1983–94); Fred Rosen and Philip Schofield (1995–2003); and Philip Schofield (2003–date).

Published volumes
12 volumes of Correspondence, of an eventual 14, have so far been published; and 23 volumes of Works. The Works volumes are not sequentially numbered.

Those volumes which have been published to date are as follows:

Correspondence
 (Reissued with minor corrections by UCL Press in open access formats in 2017)
 (Reissued with minor corrections by UCL Press in open access formats in 2017)
 (Reissued with minor corrections by UCL Press in open access formats in 2017)
 (Reissued with minor corrections by UCL Press in open access formats in 2017)
 (Reissued with minor corrections by UCL Press in open access formats in 2017)

Works
  
Now superseded by: 
 (Reprinted in paperback with a new introduction by F. Rosen and an interpretive essay by H. L. A. Hart) 


 

 

Bentham, Jeremy (2022). Causer, Tim; Schofield, Philip (eds.). Panopticon versus New South Wales, and Other Writings on Australia. London: UCL Press. ISBN               9781787359376.

References

External links
 The Bentham Project at University College London.

Jeremy Bentham
Modern philosophical literature
Philosophy books
Series of books
University College London
Works about utilitarianism